Arradon is a commune in the Morbihan department in the  Brittany region in northwestern France.

Population
The inhabitants of Arradon are known as Arradonnais.

Map

See also
Communes of the Morbihan department

References

External links
Official site 

Mayors of Morbihan Association 

Communes of Morbihan
Populated coastal places in Brittany